Gobiates is an extinct genus of prehistoric amphibians. Fossils have been found in the Barun Goyot and Djadokhta Formations of Mongolia, the Bissekty Formation of Uzbekistan and the Paluxy and Twin Mountains Formations of Texas. The following species are recognized:

See also 
 List of prehistoric amphibians

References 

Early Cretaceous amphibians
Late Cretaceous amphibians
Aptian life
Albian life
Cenomanian life
Turonian life
Coniacian life
Santonian life
Campanian life
Cretaceous amphibians of Asia
Fossils of Mongolia
Fossils of Uzbekistan
Bissekty Formation
Cretaceous amphibians of North America
Cretaceous United States
Fossils of the United States
Fossil taxa described in 1986